The Herb Alpert Award in the Arts was established in the 1994 by The Herb Alpert Foundation in collaboration with the California Institute of the Arts. The Herb Alpert Foundation, which included then-present Kip Cohen, and benefactors Herbert and Lani Alpert, approached then-president of CalArts Steven Lavine with idea of providing the opportunity for young artists at the institute to engage with current American artists as a means to provide the best possible professional training for them. CalArts had a established relationship with Herb Alpert previously from his support of the jazz program at the School of Music. 

Initially, the Alpert Foundation provided a $50,000 award to five early mid-career artists. Artist are selected in the disciplines of dance, film and video, music, theatre, and visual arts, each representative of five of the six schools schools at CalArts. In order to be selected for the award, there is a two-tier process of nominators and panelists. Each year, the CalArts faculty determines fifty artists and art professionals as nominators to select two artist each. 100 artists are then invited to apply to award, which will be judged by panel of three experts in each discipline (15 total). According to the foundation, the awards are chosen by a panel of experts and are given to risk-taking artists typically in their mid-careers. The foundation attempts to identify artists who were sensitive to the artist's potential contribution to society. Awardees spend a week at CalArts, lecturing, offering classes, and meeting individually with current students. In addition to the residency, recipients have also shown or performed their work at CalArts' professional arts theater, REDCAT, in downtown Los Angeles.

In 2010, the foundation in increased it's annual fellowship to $75,000. In 2021, the Foundation increased the number of recipients to two in each discipline, comprising with a total of ten awardees each year.

References

External links
 

Arts awards in the United States
California Institute of the Arts
Awards established in 1994
1994 establishments in California